Gatty is a surname. Notable people with the surname include:

 Alfred Gatty (1813–1903), British Church of England vicar and author
 Alfred Scott-Gatty (1847–1918), British officer of arms and composer
 Harold Gatty (1903–1957), Australian navigator, inventor, and aviation pioneer
 Harsha Raj Gatty (born 1987), Indian activist
 Juliana Horatia Ewing (née Gatty) (1841–1885), English writer of children's stories
 Katharine Gatty (1870-1952), journalist, lecturer and militant suffragette 
 Luis Gatty Ribeiro (born 1979), Bolivian footballer
 Marek Gatty-Kostyal (1886–1965), Polish chemist and pharmaceutical scientist
 Margaret Gatty (1809–1873), English writer of children's literature and naturalist
 Nicholas Gatty (1874–1946), English composer and music critic

See also
 Gatty Marine Laboratory